Katun is the second full-length album by the Mexican death metal band Hacavitz.

Track listing

Credits
Antimo Buonnano - guitar, bass, vocals
Oscar Garcia - drums, percussion

2007 albums
Hacavitz (band) albums